Nicolas Carl Hamilton (born 28 March 1992) is a British racing driver who currently competes in the British Touring Car Championship. He races with a specially-modified car due to his cerebral palsy.

Hamilton is the paternal half-brother of seven-time Formula One World Champion Lewis Hamilton.

Racing career

Renault Clio Cup United Kingdom
Hamilton made his racing debut in the Renault Clio Cup United Kingdom in 2011 driving for Total Control Racing. He attracted much fan and media attention despite finishing last in his first race. His first season was the subject of a BBC documentary entitled Racing with the Hamiltons: Nic in the Driving Seat.

European Touring Car Cup
Hamilton moved up to the European Touring Car Cup for 2013, driving a SEAT León Supercopa for Baporo Motorsport.

British Touring Car Championship
In 2015, Hamilton secured a deal with AmD Tuning to race an Audi S3 in five rounds of the British Touring Car Championship, becoming the first disabled driver to compete in the series.

In 2019, Hamilton secured a full-time drive with Motorbase Performance along with Tom Chilton and Ollie Jackson. 

On 21 February 2020, Hamilton was confirmed as the fourth Team HARD driver in a Volkswagen CC, retaining his ROKiT sponsorship. In the final race at Brands Hatch, in round 2 of the championship, Hamilton scored his first-ever BTCC point after finishing the race in 15th place.

Media career
On 8 March 2016, it was announced that Hamilton would be part of Channel 4's Formula One presentation team.

Racing record

Career summary 

† As Hamilton was a guest driver, he was ineligible for points.

Complete British Touring Car Championship results
(key) (Races in bold indicate pole position – 1 point awarded just in first race; races in italics indicate fastest lap – 1 point awarded all races; * signifies that driver led race for at least one lap – 1 point given all races)

† As Hamilton was a guest driver, he was ineligible for points.

References

External links
 
 

1992 births
Living people
English sportspeople of Grenadian descent
English racing drivers
European Touring Car Cup drivers
British Touring Car Championship drivers
People from Stevenage
Sportspeople with cerebral palsy
Renault UK Clio Cup drivers